Plutonium silicide is a binary inorganic compound of plutonium and silicon with the chemical formula PuSi. The compound forms gray crystals.

Synthesis
Reaction of plutonium dioxide and silicon carbide:

Reaction of plutonium trifluoride with silicon:

Physical properties
Plutonium silicide forms gray crystals of orthorhombic crystal system, space group Pnma, cell parameters: a = 0.7933 nm, b = 0.3847 nm, c = 0.5727 nm, Z = 4, TiSi type structure.

At a temperature of 72 °K, plutonium silicide undergoes a ferromagnetic transition.

References

Plutonium compounds
Silicon compounds
Inorganic compounds
Silicides